Sutatta Udomsilp (also known as PunPun, born June 5, 1997) is a Thai actress. She is best known for her roles in Last Summer, May Who?, and Hormones: The Series.

Early life and education 
Sutatta was born on June 5, 1997 in Bangkok, Thailand. She went to Kasetsart University Laboratory School and Ruamrudee International School before completing her bachelor's degree from the Faculty of Communication Arts at Chulalongkorn University.

She is the youngest of the three siblings. She has an older brother and an older sister.

Career 
Sutatta entered the entertainment industry at the age of 4 as an advertising model for several commercials. She marked her acting debut with Ladda Land. She went on to become as one of the main actors in the 2012 film Seven Something.

Sutatta was a Suphannahong Award winner for her leading role in Last Summer and a nominee for the "Best Actress in a Leading Role" in the 2019 Asian TV Awards for her role in Bangkok Love Stories: Plead.

She was also in the public spotlight as a "celebrity" because of her previous use of illegal drugs.

Filmography

Film

Television series

References

External links 

1997 births
Living people
Sutatta Udomsilp
Sutatta Udomsilp